Various football records can be found in the following pages and categories:

American football 
 List of National Football League records (individual)
 List of National Football League records (team)
 :Category:American football records and statistics

Association football 
 European football records
 :Category:Association football records and statistics